The psychology of torture refers to the psychological processes underlying all aspects of torture including the relationship between the perpetrator and the victim, the immediate and long-term effects, and the political and social institutions that influence its use. Torture itself is the use of physical or psychological pain to control the victim or fulfill some needs of the perpetrator.

The perpetrator of torture
Research during the past 60 years, starting with the Milgram experiment, suggests that under the right circumstances, and with the appropriate encouragement and setting, most people can be encouraged to actively torture others.

John Conroy:"When torture takes place, people believe they are on the high moral ground, that the nation is under threat and they are the front line protecting the nation, and people will be grateful for what they are doing."

Stages of the perpetrator's torture mentality include:
(Please note that not all perpetrators go through all of the stages listed)

 Reluctance:  The perpetrator is reluctant to participate or observe the administration of torture.
 Official encouragement: As the Stanford prison experiment and Milgram experiment show, in an official setting, many people will follow the direction of an authority figure (such as a superior officer) particularly if it is presented as mandatory, even if they have personal uncertainty. The main motivations for this appear to be a fear of loss of status or respect, and the desire to be seen as a "good citizen" or "good subordinate".
 Peer encouragement: The perpetrator begins to accept torture as necessary, acceptable or deserved, or to comply due to the need to conform to peer group beliefs.
 Dehumanization: The perpetrator sees victims as objects of curiosity and experimentation rather than as human beings.  The physical and psychological manipulations become just another opportunity to test the victim's response.
 Disinhibition: Sociocultural and situational pressures may cause perpetrators to undergo a lessening of moral inhibitions and as a result act in ways not normally accepted by law, custom and conscience.
 Self-perpetuating:  Within the organization, once torture becomes established as part of internally acceptable norms under certain circumstances, its use often becomes institutionalized and self-perpetuating over time.  What was once rarely used during extreme circumstances begins to be used more regularly with more reasons claimed to justify wider use.

Example:
  
One of the apparent ringleaders of the Abu Ghraib prison torture, Charles Graner Jr., exemplified the stages of dehumanization and disinhibition when he was reported to have said, "The Christian in me says it's wrong, but the corrections officer in me says, 'I love to make a grown man piss himself.'"

As P. Saliya Sumanatilake concludes:"Whether it be for securing a justifiable or reprehensible end, torture cannot be effectuated without invoking and focusing one's diffused innate cruelty. Accordingly, it is the prevalence of this congenital trait of heinousness that renders every human being a potential torturer: hence, the existence of torture! Moreover, it is the natural occurrence of such nascent evil within each successive generation of human beings that serves to propagate torture!"

Psychological effects of torture

The effects of torture on the victim and the perpetrator are likely to be influenced by many factors.  Therefore, it is unlikely that providing diagnostic categories of symptoms and behavior will be applicable across countries with very different personal, political or religious beliefs and perspectives. There is always a question about applying diagnostic categories and descriptions of symptoms or behavior developed in Western societies to people from the developing countries with very different personal, political, or religious beliefs and perspectives. One of the most marked cultural differences may occur between individualist societies where realization of personal goals often takes priority over the needs of kin and societal expectations, and collectivist societies in which the needs of family and prescribed roles take precedence over personal preferences. Another evident difference is the belief in a subsequent life in which suffering in this life is rewarded, and this has emerged in some studies of torture survivors in South East Asia.

Victims 
Torture has profound and long-lasting physical and psychological effects. Torture is a form of collective suffering that is not limited to the victim. The victims' family members and friends are often also affected due to adjustment problems such as outbreaks of anger and violence directed towards family members.  According to research, psychological and physical torture have similar mental effects. Often torture victims suffer from elevated rates of the following:
anxiety
depression
adjustment disorder
posttraumatic stress disorder (PTSD)
disorders of extreme stress not otherwise specified (DESNOS)
somatoform disorders
nightmares
intrusion
insomnia
decreased libido
memory lapses
reduced capacity to learn
sexual dysfunction
social withdrawal
emotional flatness
headaches

No diagnostic terminology encapsulates the deep distrust of others which many torture survivors have developed, nor the destruction of all that gave their lives meaning. Guilt and shame about humiliation during torture, and about the survivor's inability to withstand it, as well as guilt at surviving, are common problems which discourage disclosure.  Additional stress may be added due to uncertainty about the future, any possibility of being sent back to the country in which the survivor was tortured, and the potential lack of close confidants or social support systems.  In addition, the presence of social isolation, poverty, unemployment, institutional accommodation, and pain can all predict higher levels of emotional distress in victims who survive torture.

Victims with PTSD 
The development of the diagnosis of post traumatic stress disorder (PTSD) for American veterans of the Vietnam War can be understood as a political act which labeled the collective distress of a defeated USA as individual psychopathology. Proponents of this view, point to the de-politicization of the distress of torture survivors by describing their distress, disturbance, and profound sense of injustice in psychiatric terms. These are not only conceptual issues, because they may influence treatment outcomes.  Recovery is associated with reconstruction of social and cultural networks, economic supports, and respect for human rights.

The rich research on treatment of PTSDs in veterans has substantially informed treatment offered to torture survivors. It is more appropriate than extrapolation from work with civilian survivors of single events as individuals (assault, accidents) or as communities or groups (natural or man-made disasters). Some literature distinguishes between single-event trauma (type 1) and prolonged and repeated trauma, such as torture (type 2). There is no doubt that (disregarding concerns about the diagnosis) rates of PTSD are much higher in refugees than among people of a similar age in the countries where the refugees settle, and that, among refugees, rates of PTSD are even higher among those seeking asylum.

The argument that torture causes unique problems waxes and wanes, and is often associated with claims to particular expertise in treatment, and therefore claims on funding.   Gurr et al. describe how torture targets the person as a whole – physically, emotionally, and socially – so that PTSD is an inadequate description of the magnitude and complexity of the effects of torture. When the diagnosis of PTSD is applied, some survivors of torture who have very severe symptoms related to trauma may still not reach the criteria for diagnosis. Categories such as 'complex trauma' have been proposed, and it may be that the next iterations of the diagnostic compendia may modify the criteria.

Perpetrator 

Many people who engage in torture have various psychological deviations and often they derive sadistic satisfaction.  Torture may fulfill the emotional needs of perpetrators when they willingly engage in these activities. They lack empathy and their victims' agonized painful reactions, screaming and pleading give them a sense of authority and feelings of superiority.

Torture can harm not only the victim but the perpetrators as well. After the fact, perpetrators will often experience failing mental health, PTSD, suicidal tendencies, substance dependency and a myriad of other mental defects associated with inducing physical or mental trauma upon their victims.

The perpetrators may experience flashbacks of torture, intense rage, suicidal and homicidal ideas, alienation, impulse deregulation, alterations in attention and consciousness, alterations in self-perception, alterations in relationships with others, inability to trust and inability to maintain long-term relationships, or even mere intimacy.

Torture victims in healthcare settings

For physicians, it is useful to recognize that symptoms of post-traumatic stress can complicate presentation and treatment. Pain predicts greater severity of both PTSD symptoms and major depression, and intrusive memories and flashbacks can exacerbate existing pain. While under-recognition and under-treatment of torture victims is common, there are useful guidelines for evidence-based medical practice, although not specifically concerned with pain, and for evidence-based psychological practice.

Some people die during torture; many survivors are too disabled and destitute to find their way to safety. A large element of chance, and, to a lesser extent, resources and resilience, enable a minority to arrive in developed countries. Nevertheless, they often present multiple and complex problems, which the clinician can find overwhelming. For all these reasons, an interdisciplinary approach to assessment and treatment is therefore recommended, guarding against either disregarding significant psychological distress as inevitable in torture survivors or discounting physical symptoms by attributing them to psychological origin.

Rehabilitation and reparation are part of the rights of the torture survivor under the United Nations Convention, yet far less attention is paid to health needs on a national or international basis than to legal and civil claims. Collaborative efforts involving survivors themselves are needed to better understand the usefulness and limitations of existing assessment instruments and treatment methods. Some studies exist, such as that by Elsass et al. who interviewed Tibetan Lamas on the quantification of suffering in scales used to evaluate intervention with Tibetan torture survivors.
Education of medical and other healthcare personnel needs to address issues concerning treatment of torture survivors, who will be seen in all possible settings but not necessarily recognized or treated adequately. Teaching on ethics is also important, since medical students can have tolerant views of torture, and the complicity of medical and healthcare staff in torture continues in many countries. Medical staff are often in a key position to try to prevent torture and to help those who have survived.

The psychologist's role in torture 
In addition to providing treatment for victims of torture, psychologists have the skills and knowledge to conduct research regarding interrogation methods and determine when the methods used become torture.  The standards, policies, and procedures of each country's professional psychological association may influence the participation of psychologists in administering torture, researching torture methods, and evaluating the effectiveness of the results.  Kenneth Pope (2011) used direct quotes to indicate the American Psychological Association believes psychologists have a key role in eliciting information from people since interrogations require an understanding of psychological processes.  Each professional association sets the standards for ethics and expected professional behavior which may influence psychologist researchers who investigate interrogation or torture and clinical psychologists' participation in interrogations that use methods deemed to be consistent with torture.

For an example of policy that influences the use of torture by American psychologists, please see the American Psychological Association Council of Representatives policy released in 2015.  For an example of an external review of whether psychologists adhered to the APA ethics and policy please see the Hoffman Report (2015).

Due to differences in political power globally, professional psychological organizations in well-developed countries may have a greater influence on discovering and defining what constitutes torture. Psychological associations in less developed countries may choose to adopt the definitions, standards, and ethical positions regarding torture developed by the APA when they are unable to support research regarding torture themselves within their own culture. The professional associations in well developed countries, such as the APA are likely to have a strong influence in defining the psychology of torture globally.

The influence of social systems on torture
People within an organization may be influenced to participate in torturing people. The culture and procedures of an organization provide the foundation to allow professionals, such as physicians, to violate the medical code of ethics in a manner that appears to align and meet the necessary standards of their employment.  Annas and Crosby (2015) reported that lawyers provided advanced confirmation that physicians who participated in the enhanced interrogation techniques used at CIA sites would be given immunity for their actions since they were deemed a necessary requirement to protect the country (see also; Milgram experiment ) .

The physicians assisted by providing medical evaluations to ensure victims were healthy enough to undergo torture, developed methods of torture, ensured victims would survive the torture, and assisted victims to heal following torture procedures.  Working in a secret facility with policies and procedures that promoted an expectation that torture and enhanced interrogation practices were required to protect the nation and would not result in negative personal consequences resulted in a setting in which physicians were willing to ignore the Hippocratic oath.

The policies and procedures within the United States military have also been found to produce an environment in which torture and enhanced interrogation techniques were used. Although the military has an excellent process for recruiting and training interrogators who use non abusive techniques successfully, changes in funding resulted in fewer highly trained interrogators being available.  As more interrogators were recruited after 9/11, they were not as rigorously assessed, trained, or mentored and did not demonstrate the same abilities as the previous generation of military interrogators.  In addition, the military rank of interrogators is not sufficient to control the decisions made when interrogation is needed.  Military interrogators may be ordered to perform techniques they know to be inappropriate and ineffective by higher-ranking officers who have not been adequately educated about effective interrogation procedures.  The combination of a change in recruitment, reduced education and mentorship, and relatively low rank result in opportunities for torture and abuse to be used during interrogations.

How public beliefs influence the use of torture
Fictional stories, movies, and television shows may influence the beliefs people have regarding the efficacy of torture as a means for rapidly obtaining life-saving information.  People who believe torture is an effective interrogation method are more supportive of using torture and enhanced interrogation techniques than those who do not think it provides accurate information.  In addition, the information obtained through torture is also perceived as more valuable by people who support using torture than the same information obtained through non-abusive means of interrogation.  These findings suggest confirmation bias (perception is skewed toward what a person already believes) influences the support for torture and is influenced by many commercially available sources of fictional examples.

See also
 Psychological torture

References

Further reading
 McCoy, Alfred, A Question of Torture: CIA Interrogation, from the Cold War to the War on Terror (Hardcover)
 Conroy, John, Unspeakable Acts, Ordinary People: The Dynamics of Torture, Alfred A. Knopf, 2000.
  Dr. Sam Vaknin, "The Psychology of Torture",
  Dr Ruwan M Jayatunge M.D, "Psychological effects of Torture"
 Amanda C de C Williams, Jannie van der Merwe, "The psychological impact of Torture"
 P. Saliya Sumanatilake, "Why Do They Torture? A Study On Man's Cruelty," Stamford Lake: Colombo, Sri Lanka (2015).

External links
Human Rights First; Tortured Justice: Using Coerced Evidence to Prosecute Terrorist Suspects (2008)

Psychological abuse
Torture